Barruelo de Santullán is a municipality located in the province of Palencia, Castile and León, Spain.

According to the 2004 census (INE), the municipality had a population of 1,592 inhabitants.

References

Municipalities in the Province of Palencia